The Immediate Geographic Region of Montes Claros is one of the 7 immediate geographic regions in the Intermediate Geographic Region of Montes Claros, one of the 70 immediate geographic regions in the Brazilian state of Minas Gerais and one of the 509 of Brazil, created by the National Institute of Geography and Statistics (IBGE) in 2017.

Municipalities 
It comprises 32 municipalities.

 Bocaiuva     
 Botumirim   
 Brasília de Minas   
 Campo Azul    
 Capitão Enéas     
 Claro dos Poções     
 Coração de Jesus     
 Cristália    
 Engenheiro Navarro     
 Francisco Dumont    
 Francisco Sá     
 Glaucilândia    
 Grão Mongol    
 Guaraciama    
 Ibiracatu   
 Itacambira    
 Japonvar  
 Jequitaí    
 Joaquim Felício    
 Josenópolis     
 Juramento    
 Lagoa dos Patos     
 Lontra    
 Luislândia    
 Mirabela    
 Montes Claros     
 Olhos-d'Água    
 Patis     
 São João da Lagoa     
 São João da Ponte   
 São João do Pacuí    
 Varzelândia

References 

Geography of Minas Gerais